E-Comm 9-1-1 is a multi-municipality agency that provides emergency communications operations for British Columbia. The company coordinates 9-1-1 service for police, fire, and ambulance service, providing call-taking and dispatch services for multiple agencies in the Lower Mainland area. E-Comm's service area covers Metro Vancouver (from Lions Bay to Langley), the Sunshine Coast Regional District, south Squamish-Lillooet Regional District the Whistler-Howe Sound and Fraser Valley Regional District area serving residents in the province. The company provides call-taking for all participating municipalities, transferring incoming calls to the appropriate agency. Furthermore, E-Comm provides dispatch services for eighteen police  and fire departments.

E-Comm owns and operates the Wide-Area Radio Network (WARN), a shared communications system used by police agencies, fire departments and the entire British Columbia Ambulance Service in Metro Vancouver. The WARN features earthquake-resistant infrastructure and enhanced security measures, providing improved coverage, clarity, and reliability. The WARN allows for real-time communication between members of separate agencies, increasing inter-agency communication and coordination. WARN was replaced in Spring 2018 by the Next Generation Radio Program (NGRP)

History 
Interest in consolidating emergency communications in southwest British Columbia began in the early 1990s following a series of large-scale disasters. The disorganized state of emergency communications during those incidents demonstrated that contemporary un-integrated communications services were not effective in dealing with large incidents, and required reform.

In spring of 1994, hockey fever captured British Columbia as the Vancouver Canucks advanced to the Stanley Cup finals. When they lost the seventh and final game of the series, huge crowds of fans took to the streets to lament the team's loss and were quickly joined by troublemakers attracted to the large groups of people. The unhappy crowd soon erupted into a full-scale riot. The Vancouver Police were forced to call in the Crowd Control Unit and request back up from neighbouring Royal Canadian Mounted Police (RCMP) detachments in an effort to disperse the out-of-control crowd. In the midst of the chaos, the Vancouver Police radio system was unable to handle the increased amount of radio traffic. Paramedics, firefighters and police found themselves in danger because their radio systems were not compatible with each other.

Following the riot, widely known as the Stanley Cup Riot, the provincial government began planning for an organization that would consolidate all emergency radio and phone services to allow information sharing between agencies and members. E-Comm was established under the Emergency Communications Corporations Act of 1997. As a cost-recovery business corporation, it is owned by stakeholders made up of all the agencies that use its service, which include municipalities, police boards, provincial and federal government agencies, and crown corporations.

The E-Comm Facility 
E-Comm is located at 3301 East Pender Street, across from the Pacific National Exhibition. The E-Comm building is a post-disaster facility, designed to resist a major earthquake or other large-scale disaster, permitting the continued operation of emergency communications in such a situation. Special attention was paid to the facility's mechanical, electrical, structural and communication systems to ensure they are highly reliable, fault tolerant and resistant to hazard. The building is a reinforced concrete structure with shatterproof glass, and has storage capacity for emergency food and water. Backup support systems that lend to the building's self-sufficiency include communication, mechanical plants, emergency power generation, uninterruptible power sources, and emergency water and food storage.

The City of Vancouver's Office of Emergency Management and Emergency Operations Centre (EOC), Vancouver Emergency Community Telecommunications Organization (VECTOR), and Vancouver Emergency Social Services (ESS) are also located inside the E-Comm building.

Governance and shareholders 
E-Comm is managed by a Board of Directors made up of 20 members nominated by the shareholders. Day-to-day operation is managed by the President & CEO of E-Comm.

Shareholders include:

RCMP "E" Division is not a shareholder of E-Comm even though RCMP officers in BC are within the E-Comm radio network.

Call Statistics 

E-Comm maintains statistics about the number of calls that are made to the company within a given year, and the percentage of calls that were answered within 5 seconds ("service level"). The target service level is 95%, meaning that E-Comm aims to answer 95% of calls within 5 seconds (one ring). The reduction in number of calls over the years has been attributed to a series of public outreach campaigns teaching citizens to educate their children on the proper use of 9-1-1, and reminding citizens to lock or turn off their cell phones to prevent accidental "pocket dial" calls to 9-1-1.

Budget 
E-Comm has an annual budget of $70 million, collected through the municipalities that use E-Comm's service. This includes the "Radio Levy" (based on radios issued and traffic), the "Dispatch Levy" (based on allocation of human resources to take the call and dispatch officers) and the "9-1-1 Levy" for Metro Vancouver region that is collected through property taxes.

Next Generation Radio Program (NGRP) 
In Spring 2018, E-Comm 911 completed a full transition to replace their aging 800 MHz EDACS Wide-Area radio network The new radio system, known as the Next Generation Radio Program, utilizes a Motorola Project 25 700 Mhz band. The choice to switch to a Project 25 system was made following over a year of consultation with local stakeholders.

Per E-Comm's press release, the new Motorola system has some new key features:

 Greater reliability
 Water immersion resistance
 Radio monitoring (enabling dispatchers to remotely activate radio microphones for improved responder safety)
 Noise-cancelling technology to reduce background sounds and allow responders to be heard more clearly in noisy environments
 Increased coverage, audio clarity and security
 GPS tracking
 An expanded range of accessories and the ability to add new features through software upgrades in the future

Project 25 modulation allows first responder communications to be encrypted from monitoring by commercially-available radio scanners. All British Columbia Ambulance Service, most Metro Vancouver fire departments, and all Metro Vancouver police agencies are on the new NGRP system.

See also 
List of emergency organizations in British Columbia
List of law enforcement agencies in British Columbia
Provincial Emergency Program
Emergency Social Services

References

External links 
 

Emergency services in Canada
Emergency telephone numbers
Companies based in Vancouver
Companies established in 1997